Benhall Street is a village in Suffolk, England.

Villages in Suffolk